The Houston Shakespeare Festival (HSF) is a regional repertory theatre in Houston, Texas, United States. Each summer, the Houston Shakespeare Festival produces a season of two Shakespeare plays in repertory. Since its inception in 1975, HSF has entertained over a million theatergoers with free performances in Hermann Park's Miller Outdoor Theatre. The Houston Shakespeare Festival has since become one of the major events on Houston's summer entertainment calendar. HSF is a recognized Actors' Equity Association theatre.

History
In the summer of 1975, Dr. Sidney Berger, the then Director of the University of Houston's School of Theatre and Dance, met with the college's administrators and the Miller Outdoor Theatre Advisory Council to enlist support for a two-production season of Shakespeare's works to be played in repertory on Miller Theatre's bill.

The first year was met with acclaim, with audience size exceeding projections and local citizens writing letter of support to the University of Houston. As years have passed, HSF's budget has increased. The University of Houston provides access to its scenery workshops, office rooms, a rehearsal area and more. In 1989, The Cullen Trust for the Performing Arts gifted an endowment for HSF to enter a seasonal agreement with Actors' Equity Association.

Berger, who had started work in Houston in 1969, retired in 2007. The last play he directed at the Festival was Much Ado About Nothing, in 2010.

Leadership

'Dr. Robert Shimko (2016- )

Production history

References

External links
 

Shakespeare festivals in the United States
Tony Award winners
Regional theatre in the United States
Theatre in Texas
Theatres in Houston
Recurring events established in 1975